Bonce may refer to:

 Boncé, France
 Bonče, Republic of Macedonia